Betty Fisher may refer to:

Bettie Fisher, Australian Aboriginal jazz singer and theatre manager
Betty Fisher (badminton), player in Welsh International
Betty Fisher and Other Stories, French drama film

See also
Elizabeth Fisher (disambiguation)